The Gldani prison scandal was a political scandal in the country of Georgia involving the recorded abuse of inmates in the Georgian prison system. On September 18, 2012, several videos were released showing prison guards and their superiors torturing, taunting, and sexually assaulting detainees in Gldani No. 8 Prison. The video footage, which confirmed long-standing allegations of ill-treatment of prisoners, was released two weeks before the October 1 parliamentary elections. 

The scandal was unique in Georgian history in that it was initially shared and discussed on social media, before the story began to appear on Georgia's largely pro-government television channels. The highly controversial video footage resulted in orchestrated rallies in cities such as Tbilisi, Batumi, Poti, Kutaisi and Gori. Upset by images of graphic prisoner abuse, protestors demanded justice and promised to continue their protests. Later that night Khatuna Kalmakhelidze fired David Chakua, the Chairman of the Penitentiary Department. Several days later, Kalmakhelidze herself resigned.

Whistleblower

The video evidence of prison torture was leaked by a former prison officer Vladimir Bedukadze, who fled to Belgium and was briefly wanted in connection with the abuse, but eventually the prosecution decided to relieve him of criminal responsibility as a result of plea bargaining deal on the grounds that Bedukadze helped to uncover "systemic crimes in the Georgian penitentiary".

Videos

In the videos prisoners are shown being raped with broom handles and police batons.
 The first video shows ten prison guards conducting physical and verbal abuse on prisoners.
 In the second video a man is forced to take off his underpants and do what he was told. He is then insulted and spat upon; During the offence, an attacker makes references to him being a thief in law. In the last part of the video, the man is seen writing something under dictation.
 In the third video an Armenian prisoner is shown fettered to a cell rod and cursing Georgian prison officers. In the same video a masked man is appealing to the torturers not to record a video of him. He is mocked, humiliated and possibly raped. The third part of the video shows a rear view of a man who is repeatedly asked if he was thief in law answers of which were all: "I am a thief in law!".
 In the fourth video is shown youth detention center, where inmates were physically abused and forced to insult thieves in law under threat of being raped if they did not comply.

Reactions

Government reaction

Saakashvili demanded a complete overhaul of the prison system and commanded Vano Merabishvili to immediately enter all prisons with patrol police. "There must be zero tolerance to any violations of human rights, because we are building a civilised and humane country, rather than discipline based on violence." - he said.

People's response
An orchestrated protest rally gathered around the Philharmonic Hall on September 18, where the president was expected to arrive.

On the next day, protesters reconvened again outside the Philharmonic Hall and marched on Rustaveli Avenue towards the government's office.

Student protests
The news was met with a strong response from Georgian students. The protests drew a large number of students who protested the condition of the prison system and the inhumane treatment of prisoners shown in the video. Student groups declared that the scandal was not an isolated case and emphasized that this was the fault of the system, which needed to change. The absence of free, impartial media sources and freedom of expression was also a cause of the protests.

Later developments
On October 1st, 2012, the governing United National Movement party suffered a landslide defeat to the Georgian Dream Coalition in the parliamentary elections. The new administration promised to improve the penal system and prison conditions.

In 2013, over the span of three months, the newly elected government granted large-scale prison amnesty reducing Georgia's 24,000-person strong prison population by half.

References

External links
 
 
 

Human rights abuses in Georgia (country)
Prison rape
2012 in Georgia (country)
2012 scandals
2010s in Tbilisi
Scandals in Georgia (country)
Thieves in law
Penal system in Georgia (country)
Violence against men in Asia